The Old Georgetown Road is a historic road section near McClellanville, South Carolina, USA. It is one of longest surviving unpaved sections of the King's Highway, a colonial-era road network that extended all the way from Charleston, South Carolina, to Boston, Massachusetts.

The road was listed on the National Register of Historic Places in 2014.

See also

National Register of Historic Places listings in Charleston County, South Carolina

References

Roads on the National Register of Historic Places in South Carolina
Transportation in Charleston County, South Carolina
National Register of Historic Places in Charleston County, South Carolina